A penalty unit (PU) is a standard amount of money used to compute penalties for many breaches of law in Australia at both the federal, and state and territory level. Fines are calculated by multiplying the value of a penalty unit by the number of units prescribed for the offence. For example, if a crime was committed in New South Wales worth 100 units, the fine would be .

Prior to the introduction of penalty units, fines and other charges were usually prescribed in terms of ordinary money. However, the effects of inflation meant that originally substantial penalties eventually lost their worth. Frequent amendment of the many laws and regulations dealing with pecuniary penalties would be a very time-consuming process. Penalty units provide a quick and simple way to adjust many different fees and charges.

Values 
The different jurisdictions that make up Australia each set their own value of a penalty unit. The value as well as the manner and frequency of adjusting that value differ between jurisdictions.

See also 
 Standard scale

References 

Australian criminal law